Hanstveit is a Norwegian surname. Notable people with the surname include:

Erlend Hanstveit (born 1981), Norwegian footballer
Ketill Hanstveit (born 1973), Norwegian triple jumper

Norwegian-language surnames